Farnborough railway station may refer to:

Farnborough (Main) railway station
Farnborough North railway station